Elections were held for one-third of the 78 seats on the Newcastle City Council on 1 May 2008. The ruling Liberal Democrat Party slightly increased their majority, and the table below shows the composition of the Council Chamber following these results.

2008
21st century in Newcastle upon Tyne
2008 English local elections